Vitālijs Korņilovs (born 17 July 1979) is a Latvian cyclist, who currently rides for UCI Continental team . He competed in the individual pursuit at the 2020 UCI Track Cycling World Championships.

Major results
2006
 3rd Time trial, National Road Championships
2008
 National Road Championships
3rd Time trial
5th Road race
2009
 3rd Riga Grand Prix
2011
 3rd Time trial, National Road Championships
2016
 5th Time trial, National Road Championships
2019
 4th Road race, National Road Championships
2020
 National Track Championships
1st  Individual pursuit
3rd Points race
3rd Omnium
 3rd Time trial, National Road Championships

References

External links

1979 births
Living people
Latvian male cyclists